Club de Fútbol Sala Bilbao is a futsal club based in Bilbao, city of the province of Vizcay in the autonomous community of Basque Country.

The club was founded in 1984 and her home arena is La Casilla with capacity of 5,200 seaters.

Its main sponsor is Tecuni.

Season to season

1 season in Primera División
15 seasons in Segunda División
4 seasons in Segunda División B
6 season in Tercera División

External links
Official website

Futsal clubs in Spain
Football clubs in the Basque Country (autonomous community)
Futsal clubs established in 1984
1984 establishments in Spain
Sports teams in Bilbao
Sports teams in the Basque Country (autonomous community)